Yankam (Yangkam), or Bashar (Basherawa), is a moribund Plateau language of Nigeria. It is located to the west of Bashar town in Plateau State.

Yangkam-speaking villages are Tukur, Bayar, Pyaksam, and Kiram. All speakers are elderly, with a total of approximately 400 fluent speakers remaining.

References

Endangered Niger–Congo languages
Tarokoid languages
Languages of Nigeria